Lucius Sergius Fidenas was a Roman politician during the 5th century BC, and was elected consul in 437 and 429 BC. In 433, 424, and 418 BC he was military tribune with consular power.

Family
He was a member of the Sergii Fidenates, branch of the gens Sergia. His complete name was Lucius Sergius C.f. C.n. Fidenas.

Career
In 437 BC, Sergius was elected consul with Marcus Geganius Macerinus. The year before, Fidenae had revolted against Rome and joined Lars Tolumnius, king of the Veientians. Roman ambassadors Gaius Fulcinius, Tullus Cloelius, Spurius Antius, and Lucius Roscius were sent to Fidenae, and were put to death by order of king Tolumnius. Statues of the ambassadors were set up in the rostra at the public's expense. This began the second war between Rome and Veii, which would mark the first that Rome would defeat the army of king Tolumnius on their side of the river Anio, but with heavy losses. For his accomplishments in the war, Sergius earned the cognomen Fidenas.

In 433 BC, Sergius was elected military tribune with consular power alongside Marcus Fabius Vibulanus and Marcus Folius Flaccinator. That year saw a pestilence. According to Diodorus Siculus, Athens was affected harshly by that plague which he says killed over 10,000 people there. A temple was vowed to Apollo, which would be built two years later and was dedicated to Apollo Medicus.

Sergius was elected consul again in 429 BC, with Hostus Lucretius Tricipitinus. During their term, Roman territory was the victim of raids by the Veientians. In 428 BC, Sergius was selected by the senate, with Quintus Servilius and Mamercus Aemilius Mamercinus to investigate Fidenae and remove some of its people to Ostia.

Again in 424 BC, Sergius was elected military tribune with consular power, with Appius Claudius Crassus, Spurius Nautius Rutilus, and Sextus Julius Iulus. Grand games were organized to celebrate Rome's victory over Veii and Fidenae. Appius Claudius was left in charge of the city and held elections for the next consulship.

In 418, Sergius was elected military tribune with consular power again and for the third time, with Gaius Servilius Axilla and Marcus Papirius Mugillanus. A new enemy, the Labiciani, had allied themselves with the Aequi and they pillaged the fields of Tusculum the previous year. Upon coming to power, the military tribunes declared war and raised a levy. Sergius took command against the Aequi and fought a battle near their camp on disadvantageous ground, during which he lost his life. In response to his death, Quintus Servilius Priscus was made dictator by the senate.

References

Sources

Ancient
 Titus Livius in Roman History book 4.
 Diodorus Siculus in Bibliotheca Historica books 12 and 13.

Modern
 
 

5th-century BC Roman consuls
Roman consular tribunes
Sergii